Mikhail Mikhailovich Osinov (born 29 December 2000) is a Russian football player. He plays as a right back or right midfielder for FC Kosmos Dolgoprudny.

Club career
He made his debut for the main squad of FC Rostov on 26 September 2018 in a Russian Cup game against FC Syzran-2003.

On 9 July 2021, he joined FC Olimp-Dolgoprudny-2 on loan.

Personal life
His father Mikhail Osinov also was a professional footballer.

References

External links
 
 
 

2000 births
Living people
Russian footballers
Association football midfielders
Association football defenders
FC Rostov players
FC Nizhny Novgorod (2015) players
FC Mashuk-KMV Pyatigorsk players